Consolação is a station on Line 2 (Green) of the São Paulo Metro.  A moving walkway connects to Paulista station on Line 4 (Yellow).

Station layout

References

São Paulo Metro stations
Railway stations opened in 1991
1991 establishments in Brazil
Railway stations located underground in Brazil